"Everybody Knows" is the third single taken from John Legend's third studio album, Evolver. The song was released as a download only single in the UK on 23 March 2009, which coincided with his UK tour for Evolver.

Music video

The music video for "Everybody Knows" premiered on 20 January 2009. It was directed by Anthony Mandler. The video for "Everybody Knows" features Legend walking through city streets and a park along with a couple arguing and making up in the street, an elderly couple sitting on a bench in the park, reading a book along with other situations featuring couples. The video is portrayed as being set in New York City, however, much of it was actually filmed in Providence, Rhode Island.

Formats and track listings

UK Digital Download
 "Everybody Knows" [4:35]
 "Everybody Knows" (Live from World Cafe) [5:24]
 "Green Light" (Karmatronic Club Mix) (featuring Andre 3000) [6:21]

Official Versions
 Everybody Knows (Album Version) [4:35]
 Everybody Knows (Afroganic Radio Edit) [3:39]
 Everybody Knows (Live from World Cafe) [5:24]
 Everybody Knows (Love to Infinity Radio Edit) [4:02]

Charts

Weekly charts

Year-end charts

References

Official John Legend Everybody Knows Music Video

2009 singles
John Legend songs
Music videos directed by Anthony Mandler
Contemporary R&B ballads
Pop ballads
Songs written by John Legend
GOOD Music singles
2008 songs
Songs written by Kawan Prather
Songs written by Malay (record producer)